Buck is a 2D side-scrolling action-adventure brawler video game developed and published by Israeli indie studio Wave Interactive (Rainfall Entertainment). It was released on Steam Early Access on March 17, 2017, for Microsoft Windows with additional platforms slated for Q3 2017 including PlayStation 4 and Xbox One.

The game features melee and ranged combat, inventory management, player-driven dialogues and weapon customization that is made possible through item crafting.

The plot focuses on Buck, a motorcycle garage mechanic who decides to leave everything he knows behind in order to find the truth behind a girl's disappearance.

Buck had a successful Kickstarter campaign which raised just above the goal of $30,000.

The game was removed on steam in 2021, and has gone on hiatus for the time being

Gameplay 
Buck is a single-player side-scrolling brawler where the player controls Buck, a lonely garage mechanic who knows how to fight and build weapons. The game currently features three weapons: a sawed-off shotgun, a heavy melee exhaust pipe and a pair of custom-made revolvers. Each weapon has a specific function to counter different enemy types throughout the game. Each weapon can be upgraded in four different ways and the player must decide which weapon to upgrade and in what order.

Buck has basic melee attacks that can be combined with any of his equipped weapons, allowing multiple solutions to every combat encounter. Buck can dodge enemy attacks to gain a short but crucial invulnerability window to escape or re-position. Attacking and dodging cost stamina which is a finite resource with a short recovery cooldown.

Buck will also need to engage with characters in the world where fully voiced dialogues are included. The player will need to choose Buck's answers and determine his personality. These dialogues occur in the game's 'safe-zones' or town hubs, the first of which is Westown.

Safe zones like Westown are where the player goes to unlock new missions and move the plot forward. Mission levels are designed with branching paths, random enemy spawns, hidden loot caches and percentage-based loot drops from enemies to encourage returning to previously explored areas.

Levels have light platforming elements where the player can use zip-lines, elevators, slides, ladders and platforms to get across the level.

Buck's HUD includes his health, stamina and ammunition count. He has access to his inventory, fast-travel map and journal as well.

Item management plays a key role in the game since Buck can only carry up to 10 items. Most items can stack up to four before taking an additional slot, but crafting recipes require at least three different materials. The player cannot take all the items Buck finds; some will have to be dropped in favor of crafting other components.

*Note that some gameplay elements might be subject to change until Buck finishes development on Steam Early Access.

Plot 
The story of Buck will unfold as Early Access development continues.

The game follows the character of Buck from the moment he decides to leave the comfort of his home to venture out into the unforgiving wasteland. Ignoring his step-dad's advice, he leaves his home to try to find out what happened Jodie, a girl who spent some time with Buck at his garage/home.

The story is told through the narration of Buck's step-father, Grit, an old and gravely voiced Vulture.

Development 
Development on Buck began in February 2013. However, the concept art, characters, plot and initial art assets were made in 2002. The game's director, Gal, was 12 years old when he decided to make a game about his dog. His older brother, Adi Katz, who does all the art for the game, has helped him design the characters and the world they inhabit. The plot, style and tone of the game have changed dramatically over the years.

The plot and tone of the game has undergone many iterations. Gal said that once the real Buck had died, the story became much grimmer and darker.  Today, he describes the game as a sort of "Metroidlike, Apocalpytic-Noir brawler".

Gal cited multiple sources of his inspiration, including Who Framed Roger Rabbit, Sin City, Waterworld, The Blues Brothers and most notably the anime series Trigun.

The team still uses the sole proprietor name "Wave Interactive" but has since opened a company called Rainfall Entertainment which is based in the UK.

After Buck when on Hiatus . Gal and his team are now working on a Vietnam fps shooter called born to build . under the new company named lonely orca studio

Reception 
The game and its kickstarter campaign were noticed by the gaming press.

References

2017 video games
Xbox One games
MacOS games
Linux games
PlayStation Network games
Side-scrolling beat 'em ups
Windows games
Video games developed in Israel
PlayStation 4 games
Single-player video games